The Rural City of Murray Bridge is a local government area of South Australia centred on the regional city of Murray Bridge and stretching south to Lake Alexandrina. It was formed in 1977 by amalgamation of the District Council of Mobilong and the Corporation of Murray Bridge.

It includes the surrounding towns and localities of Avoca Dell, Brinkley, Chapman Bore, East Wellington, Ettrick, Gifford Hill, Greenbanks, Jervois, Kepa, Long Flat, Mobilong, Monarto, Monarto South, Monteith, Mulgundawa, Murrawong, Murray Bridge East, Murray Bridge North, Murray Bridge South, Mypolonga, Nalpa, Northern Heights, Pallamana, Riverglades, Riverglen, Rocky Gully, Sunnyside, Swanport, Toora, Wellington, White Hill, White Sands, Willow Banks, Woodlane and Woods Point, and parts of Burdett, Callington, Caloote, Naturi, Rockleigh, Tepko, Tolderol, Wall Flat and Lake Alexandrina.

History

It was first established in 1977 as the District Council of Murray Bridge with the amalgamation of the Corporate Town of Murray Bridge and the surrounding District Council of Mobilong. It was renamed the Rural City of Murray Bridge when it gained city status on 26 January 1993.

Councillors
The Rural City of Murray Bridge has a directly-elected mayor. The current elected councillors  are as follows:

References

External links

Murray Bridge, Rural City of
1977 establishments in Australia